Cole Camp is a small city in Benton County, Missouri, United States. The population was 1,121 at the 2010 census.

The town is known for the annual street fair in September. It also hosts a Maifest in May, an Oktoberfest in October, and a Christbaumfest in late November; all highlight the town's German heritage.

History
Cole Camp was laid out in 1857. The city most likely was named after pioneer Captain Stephen Cole.

Cole Camp was the site of a skirmish early in the American Civil War, when the local pro-Union Home Guard company was attacked by a Missouri State Guard force on June 19, 1861. At the Battle of Cole Camp, the Home Guard were defeated with a loss of 35 men killed or wounded.

The Central Cole Camp Historic District and Augustus Sander House are listed on the National Register of Historic Places.

Geography
Cole Camp is located in northeast Benton County along Missouri Route 52 approximately four miles west of US Route 65. The headwaters of Cole Camp Creek are adjacent to the west side of the community.

Demographics

2010 census
As of the census of 2010, there were 1,121 people, 492 households, and 286 families residing in the city. The racial makeup of the city was 98.2% White, 0.1% Native American, 0.3% Asian, 0.3% from other races, and 1.2% from two or more races. Hispanic or Latino of any race were 0.9% of the population.

There were 492 households, of which 27.0% had children under the age of 18 living with them, 45.1% were married couples living together, 10.0% had a female householder with no husband present, 3.0% had a male householder with no wife present, and 41.9% were non-families. 38.0% of all households were made up of individuals, and 26.2% had someone living alone who was 65 years of age or older. The average household size was 2.16 and the average family size was 2.85.

The median age in the city was 47.3 years. 21.6% of residents were under the age of 18; 7.1% were between the ages of 18 and 24; 18.2% were from 25 to 44; 23.5% were from 45 to 64; and 29.5% were 65 years of age or older. The gender makeup of the city was 44.7% male and 55.3% female.

2000 census
As of the census of 2000, there were 1,028 people, 451 households, and 261 families residing in the city. The population density was 1,050.6 people per square mile (405.0/km2). There were 493 housing units at an average density of 503.8 per square mile (194.2/km2). The racial makeup of the city was 98.93% White, 0.10% African American, 0.10% Native American, 0.19% Asian, and 0.68% from two or more races. Hispanic or Latino of any race were 0.49% of the population.

There were 451 households, out of which 25.9% had children under the age of 18 living with them, 49.2% were married couples living together, 5.8% had a female householder with no husband present, and 42.1% were non-families. 40.8% of all households were made up of individuals, and 27.5% had someone living alone who was 65 years of age or older. The average household size was 2.16 and the average family size was 2.96.

In the city the population was spread out, with 21.9% under the age of 18, 7.9% from 18 to 24, 24.3% from 25 to 44, 17.5% from 45 to 64, and 28.4% who were 65 years of age or older. The median age was 42 years. For every 100 females, there were 80.0 males. For every 100 females age 18 and over, there were 77.7 males.

The median income for a household in the city was $26,190, and the median income for a family was $37,250. Males had a median income of $26,827 versus $22,500 for females. The per capita income for the city was $17,280. About 2.1% of families and 6.2% of the population were below the poverty line, including 0.5% of those under age 18 and 14.1% of those age 65 or over.

Education
Cole Camp R-1 School District operates one public elementary school, one middle school, and Cole Camp High School. Cole Camp Methodist Pre-School and Trinity Lutheran Pre-School are private institutions.  As of 2022 Cole Camp High School is ranked by U.S. News and World Report as the #195 best high school in Missouri, with an enrollment of 222 students.

Cole Camp has a public library, a branch of the Boonslick Regional Library.

Notable people
 Matt Bohon - bull rider on the PBR's Built Ford Tough Series
 Martin Heinrich, raised in Cole Camp. Former congressman and U.S. Senator from New Mexico
 Stan Kroenke- owner of Los Angeles Rams, Denver Nuggets, Colorado Avalanche, and majority owner of Arsenal

See also
 Cole Camp Creek

References

External links
 Cole Camp, Missouri web site
 Camp Cole in the Civil War years
 Historic maps of Cole Camp in the Sanborn Maps of Missouri Collection at the University of Missouri

Cities in Benton County, Missouri
German-American culture in Missouri
German communities in the United States
Cities in Missouri